Meto Jovanovski (born 17 January 1946) is a Macedonian actor. He appeared in more than sixty films since 1971.

Selected filmography

External links 

1946 births
Living people
Macedonian male film actors
People from Pehčevo Municipality
20th-century Macedonian male actors
21st-century Macedonian male actors